Jaffar Idukki is an Indian actor, impressionist, and comedian, who predominantly works in the Malayalam cinema. Started his career with the 2007 film Kaiyoppu, he has acted in about hundred films and has performed in a number of comedy stage shows.

Filmography

All films are in Malayalam language unless otherwise noted.

References

External links
 

Living people
Male actors from Kerala
Indian male film actors
Indian impressionists (entertainers)
21st-century Indian male actors
Indian male television actors
Indian male comedians
Malayalam comedians
20th-century Indian male actors
Male actors in Malayalam television
Year of birth missing (living people)